Sean Daly (12 February 1933 – 14 June 1987) was an Irish equestrian. He competed in two events at the 1960 Summer Olympics.

References

External links
 

1933 births
1987 deaths
Irish male equestrians
Olympic equestrians of Ireland
Equestrians at the 1960 Summer Olympics
Sportspeople from County Galway